Eucosmophora echinulata is a moth of the family Gracillariidae. It is known from Paraguay.

The length of the forewings is 4.1 mm for females.

The larvae probably feed on a Fabaceae species and probably mine the leaves of their host plant.

Etymology
The specific epithet is derived from the Greek echinulatos (meaning with small spines), in reference to the dense concentration of spines within the corpus bursae.

References

Acrocercopinae
Moths described in 2005